Coron Bay is a well-known recreational diving region in the Sulu Sea in the western Philippines, between the islands of Coron and Busuanga in the Calamian Islands. Most of Coron Bay is in the Coron Island Protected Area and is a traditional fishing area of the indigenous Tagbanwa tribe.

Coron Bay is famous for diving on ten Japanese shipwrecks. The ships , Okikawa Maru, Kogyo Maru, Olympia Maru, Taiei Maru, Kyokuzan Maru, East Tangat Gunboat and Lusong Island Gunboat were sunk on September 24, 1944, by the third air fleet of US Task Force 38. The wrecks can be reached in a one-hour drive from Coron by dive boat. With the exception of the Lusong Island Gunboat, which partially breaks through the water surface and is therefore suitable for snorkelers, and the East Tangat Gunboat, which is suitable for beginners at a depth of 5 to 20 m, all other wrecks lie at depths of 20 to 45 m. Some of the wrecks are over 100 m long and have decks, corridors, galleys etc. that can be dived. Some equipment has been salvaged from some of the wrecks (e.g. the engine blocks removed), but there are still various equipment and some grenades there. Because of the depth and size of the sunk ships, nitrox is usually used for diving because of the longer no-stop time and shorter decompression stops.

References

Bays of the Philippines
Bodies of water of the Sulu Sea
Landforms of Palawan
Underwater diving sites in the Philippines